Canon EOS (Electro-Optical System) is an autofocus single-lens reflex camera (SLR) and mirrorless camera series produced by Canon Inc. Introduced in 1987 with the Canon EOS 650, all EOS cameras used 35 mm film until October 1996 when the EOS IX was released using the new and short-lived APS film. In 2000, the D30 was announced, as the first digital SLR designed and produced entirely by Canon. Since 2005, all newly announced EOS cameras have used digital image sensors rather than film. The EOS line is still in production as Canon's current digital SLR (DSLR) range, and, with the 2012 introduction of the Canon EOS M, Canon's mirrorless interchangeable-lens camera (MILC) system. In 2018 the system was further extended with the introduction of the EOS R camera, Canon's first full frame mirrorless interchangeable lens system.

The development project was called "EOS" (Electro Optical System). EOS is also the name of the goddess of dawn in Greek mythology, which further signifies the design's generational stature.

The EOS emblem was created using Handel Gothic typography.

It competes primarily with the Nikon F series and its successors, as well as autofocus SLR systems from Olympus Corporation, Pentax, Sony/Minolta, and Panasonic/Leica.

At the heart of the system is the EF lens mount, which replaced the previous FD lens mount, which mainly supported only manual-focus lenses. The EOS R full frame camera introduced a new lens mount to the system – the RF mount.

EF lens mount

The bayonet-style EF lens mount is at the centre of the EOS camera system. Breaking compatibility with the earlier FD mount, it was designed with no mechanical linkages between moving parts in the lens and in the camera. The aperture and focus are controlled via electrical contacts, with motors in the lens itself.  This was similar in some ways to Canon's earlier attempt at AF with the T80. Other manufacturers including Contax (with its G series of interchangeable-lens 35 mm rangefinder cameras), Nikon's 1983 F3AF, and Olympus (with its Four Thirds System) have since embraced this type of direct drive system.  It is a large lens mount compared to most of its competition, enabling the use of larger aperture lenses.

EOS flash system

The flash system in the EOS cameras has gone through a number of evolutions since its first implementation.  The basic EOS flash system was actually developed not for the first EOS camera, but rather for the last high-end FD-mount manual-focus camera, the T90, launched in 1986.  This was the first Canon camera with through-the-lens (TTL) flash metering, although other brands had been metering that way for some time.  It also introduced the A-TTL (Advanced TTL) system for better flash exposure in program mode, using infrared preflashes to gauge subject distance.

This system was carried over into the early EOS cameras wholesale.  A-TTL largely fell out of favor, and was replaced by E-TTL (Evaluative TTL).  This used a pre-flash for advanced metering, and used the autofocus system to judge where the main subject was for more accurate exposure.  E-TTL II, which was an enhancement in the camera's firmware only, replaced E-TTL from 2004.

Canon Speedlite-brand flashes have evolved alongside the cameras.  They are capable of wired and wireless multi-flash setups, the latter using visible or infrared pulses to synchronise. Later models, including RT in their model name, can also communicate via radio links, where up to 16 units can make up a network. Canon also produces Speedlite accessories, including the OC-E3 Off-Camera Shoe Cord, which can be used to hand-hold the flash while allowing the camera to control it through the cord. The Off-Camera Shoe Cord is popular among portrait photographers who need to have more control over lighting than a camera mounted flash can offer.

EOS cameras
As of 2017, Canon has released no fewer than 70 EOS SLR and DSLR camera models, starting with the introduction of the EOS 650 in 1987.  In the 1990s, Canon worked with Kodak to produce digital camera bodies, starting with the EOS DCS 3 in 1995.  The first digital EOS SLR camera wholly designed and manufactured by Canon was the EOS D30, released in 2000.

Canon sold two EOS cameras designed to use the APS film format, the EOS IX and the EOS IX Lite.

Canon also sold a manual-focus camera, the Canon EF-M, which used the same EF lens mount as the EOS cameras.  It came with all the automatic and manual exposure functions but lacked autofocus.  It came equipped with a split-screen/microprism focusing screen for precise manual focusing.

Eye-controlled focusing

Through the tracking of eyeball movements, EOS cameras equipped with eye-controlled focusing (ECF) (some identifiable by the suffix E) were able to select the desired autofocus point in the scene, based on where the user was looking in the viewfinder frame.  ECF was especially useful in sports photography where the subject may shift its position in the frame rapidly.

EOS cameras equipped with ECF were the EOS A2E (U.S. model names are shown; see the table below for equivalents in other countries), EOS Elan IIE, EOS IXe, EOS-3, EOS Elan 7E, and EOS Elan 7NE.

Canon did not continue its use of eye-controlled focusing for its digital SLRs. The EOS Elan 7NE was the last EOS camera to have this function, until in 2021 Canon reintroduced eye-controlled focus with the EOS R3.

Quick control dial

Most prosumer and professional level EOS cameras feature a large quick control dial (QCD) on the camera back.  The first consumer-level EOS camera with this feature was the EOS 760D/Rebel T6s, announced in February 2015. This feature allows easy adjustment of certain parameters using the thumb. The QCD is used for quick access to often-used functions that would otherwise require a more complicated procedure of button presses and dial clicks. Settings such as ISO button, Exposure Compensation button, or menus are all easily available through the QCD.

Cameras equipped with the QCD can easily be operated with one hand (forefinger on the main dial, thumb on the QCD) without taking the eye off the viewfinder.

A QCD is programmed to perform useful functions, which may include setting exposure compensation, setting of aperture in manual exposure mode, and scrolling of images and menus in digital EOS cameras.

Multi-point autofocus system
Currently, top-line EOS cameras have either 61 or 65 user-selectable autofocus (AF) points. Autofocus is a camera's ability to focus a lens automatically on an object by pressing down on the shutter button. Autofocus most often chooses the closest image in the field of view to focus on. The following EOS cameras feature such a system, with 61 points unless otherwise indicated:
 The EOS 5D Mark III, introduced in March 2012.
 The EOS-1D X, announced in October 2011 and originally scheduled for sale in April 2012, but delayed until June 2012. Since replaced by a Mark II version.
 The EOS 7D Mark II, on sale since November 2014. This APS-C body has Canon's first (and so far only) 65-point AF system.
 The EOS 5Ds and 5Ds R, two closely related higher-resolution full-frame bodies otherwise similar to the 5D MkIII, announced in February 2015 with sales beginning in June of that year.
 The EOS-1D X Mark II, the replacement for the original 1D X, announced in February 2016 with sales expected to begin in April of that year.
 The EOS 5D Mark IV, announced in August 2016 as the replacement for the 5D Mk III.
The release of the 5D Mark III gave Canon the lead once again in this category; previously, its top-line cameras had 45 AF points, which led the industry until Nikon released its D3 and D300 DSLRs with 51-point AF systems.

A higher number of AF points increases the chances of a sharply focused photograph in situations where the subject travels across the frame at high speeds (e.g. sports, wildlife).

Having so many AF points also helps relieve the photographer from having to use the 'lock focus and recompose' method of framing a photograph that can introduce focusing inaccuracy. The camera generally focuses on the closest object or on human faces, which may not be what the photographer wants, so EOS cameras equipped with a multi-point AF system still allow the photographer to manually select an AF point.

The EOS-3, EOS-1v, all EOS-1D models prior to the EOS-1D X, EOS 80D, EOS 77D, and EOS 800D/Rebel T7i feature a 45-point AF system. Most Canon DSLRs introduced since late 2005, starting from the EOS 20D and the Rebel XTi (400D), feature a nine-point AF system in a diamond-shape formation. The EOS 5D, released in 2005, takes this 9-point AF system a step further by introducing six more 'invisible' AF points (i.e., not user selectable) in helping the camera acquire focus faster during subject tracking. There have been several exceptions to Canon's recent rule of a 9-point AF system. The EOS 1000D (Rebel XS) has the 7-point AF system of most older Canon DSLRs.  The EOS 7D, released in 2009, has a 19-point AF layout, fitting essentially within the same diamond-shaped area of the frame as the nine-point layout. The EOS 70D, released in August 2013, inherited the 7D's 19-point layout, but with fewer AF control options. The 70D system was in turn handed down to the EOS 750D (Rebel T6i) and 760D (Rebel T6s), announced in February 2015. As mentioned above, the EOS 5D Mark III, EOS-1D X, EOS 5DS/5DS R, and EOS-1D X Mark II have 61-point AF layouts. The EOS 6D, released in October 2012, has an 11-point layout. The EOS 80D, announced in 2016, marked the return of 45-point AF systems to the Canon EOS line, as well as the first appearance of a 45-point system in a non-professional body. This system was brought downmarket in 2017 with its inclusion in the upper-entry-level EOS 77D and mid-entry-level EOS 800D/Rebel T7i.

For the earlier generation of 45-point AF system, the central column of 1 or 2 sensors (7 in all up to EOS-1Ds Mk II, EOS-1D Mk II N) are cross-type sensors, which are sensitive to both vertical and horizontal lines to offer a high degree of accuracy. The EOS-1Ds Mk III, replaced by the EOS-1D X, has 19 cross-type sensors for higher accuracy, as well as placing the cross-type sensors to complement the Rule of Thirds. The other Canon professional SLR replaced by the EOS-1D X, the APS-H EOS-1D Mk IV, has 39 cross-type sensors, a major increase from the 19 of the Mk III. Of the 61 AF points of the EOS-1D X and 5D MkIII, 21 central points and 20 outer points are cross-type, and five central points are dual-cross-type (sensitive to diagonal lines in addition to horizontal and vertical). All 65 points of the 7D MkII are cross-type, but only the center point is dual-cross-type.

Similarly, all AF points on later generations of the X0D series (beginning with the 40D and continuing through the current 80D) are cross-type sensors for higher accuracy, and the center sensor is dual-cross-type for even greater accuracy and sensitivity. In June 2012, the EOS 650D (Rebel T4i) became the first consumer-level Canon to receive this AF system.

Naming scheme of EOS DSLR and SLR cameras
Identical Canon models are sometimes marketed under different names in different parts of the world. For example, the EOS Rebel 2000 known in the Americas is also known as EOS Kiss III in Japan, and EOS 300 in other parts of the world.

Naming scheme of EOS M Series MILC cameras

Naming scheme of EOS R Series MILC cameras

Film cameras
This is a list of the 35 mm Film and APS Canon EOS models in order of introduction:

Digital cameras

Prior to the introduction of the EOS D30 digital SLR, Kodak produced four digital SLRs also sold under the Canon brand. These cameras used a digital camera back with the image sensor and associated electronics designed and built by Kodak together with modified internals of the EOS-1N film SLR. Due to using the Canon EOS body, these four digital SLRs can accept EF lenses. The four cameras were:

After termination of the agreement by Canon, Kodak cooperated with Sigmawho at that time had a Canon licenseto produce the Kodak DCS Pro SLR/c based on a SA9 SLR body in 2004, which was compatible with EF lenses.

The following digital SLRs, starting from the D30, had bodies and sensors completely designed and manufactured by Canon (except for the Canon EOS-1D, which uses a Panasonic sourced CCD sensor).

Canon digital SLRs are equipped with a CMOS sensor (with the exception of EOS-1D that uses a CCD sensor). Canon designs and manufactures their own CMOS sensors.

See also

Canon
 Canon Corporation
 Canon Cinema EOS
 Canon FD lens mount
 Canon FL
 Canon EF lens mount
 Canon RF lens mount
 List of Canon products
 Canon EF-S lens mount, a derivative of the EF mount designed for DSLRs with APS-C sensors
 Canon EF-M lens mount, a derivative of the EF mount designed for MILCs with APS-C sensors

Single lens reflex
 Single lens reflex
 Digital single lens reflex
 35 mm film

References

External links
 EOS Camera Systems homepage at Canon.com
 Canon EF Lens Catalogue 2018
 The Canon EOS FAQs
 Flash Photography with Canon EOS Cameras – Part 1 – Part 2 – Part 3
 EOS magazine
 Canon Camera Museum

Canon EOS cameras